Adena Williams Loston (born 1952) is the 14th president of St. Philip’s College. She was installed as the new president in ceremonies on March 1, 2007. St. Philip’s College, located in San Antonio, Texas, is the only historically Black college and Hispanic-serving institution in the United States.

Education
Loston earned her Bachelor of Science degree from Alcorn State University in 1973. She received her Master of Education and Doctor of Philosophy degrees from Bowling Green State University in 1974 and 1979 respectively. She also attended the Institute for Educational Management at Harvard University in 1996.

Career

Loston has taught as an associate professor at Georgia State University and an instructor at Arkansas State University and Houston Community College. She also taught as an adjunct instructor at the University of Houston–Downtown and Texas Southern University.

She then served as the Dean of Vocational Education, Budgets and Facilities, and Dean of Professional Programs at Santa Monica College, the Executive Dean/Provost in the El Paso Community College District, and ultimately as the President of San Jacinto College South, in Houston, Texas. She became the second president of San Jacinto College South and the first African-American president in the District.

Loston then served as the director of education and special assistant for Suborbital and Special Orbital Projects Directorate for the Goddard Space Flight Center, Wallops Flight Facility and Chief Education Officer for the National Aeronautics and Space Administration at its headquarters in Washington, D.C. Her initial appointment at NASA was as the associate administrator for education on October 28, 2002, and prior to joining the agency, she served as the NASA Administrator’s senior education advisor starting in September 2002.

As NASA’s senior education official, she was responsible for structuring the Office of Education, providing executive leadership, policy direction, functional management, and guidance in coordinating the Agency’s overall efforts to organize and enhance its education investments and portfolio nationally and internationally for its Headquarter operations, mission directorates and 10 field centers. Loston was responsible for a $230 million budget (including earmarks) and directed policy for $1.3 billion.

Awards and honors
Loston has been recognized with several awards, including:
Texas Diabetes Institute: Wall of Honor Inductee 2019—Heart of Care;
Outstanding Leadership Medal, from the National Aeronautics & Space Administration;
National Aeronautics and Space Administration’s (NASA) Exceptional Achievement Medal from the Goddard Space Flight Center;
Group Achievement Award, Educator Astronaut Program, National Aeronautics & Space Administration;
Group Achievement Award, NASA Explorer Schools Program, National Aeronautics & Space Administration;
Group Achievement Award, NASA’s Centennial of Flight Team, National Aeronautics & Space Administration;
Honorary Doctor of Science from Wiley College;
W.E.B. DuBois Higher Education Award from the National Alliance of Black School Educators;
Leadership Award from the Higher Education Commission of The National Alliance of Black School Educators;
Outstanding Women in Action Education Award from the La Prensa Foundation;
Les Dames d'Escoffier Legacy Award;
Alcorn State University Metro-Jackson Alumni Chapter - Leadership Legends Award;
University Health Systems - 2019 Wall of Honor Inductee, Heart of Care Award;
The CPS Energy Amazing Energy Award;
San Antonio Women's Hall of Fame Inductee;
The Phi Theta Kappa Honor Society’s Shirley B. Gordon International Presidential Award of Distinction;
Educator's Hall of Fame from the National Sorority of Phi Delta Kappa, Inc.;
The NAACP Daisy Bates Education Advocacy Award;
The Accomplished Graduate Award from Bowling Green State University;
The Strong-Turner Alumni Chapter and Arkansas State University Award for Outstanding Leadership;
The Education Technology Think Tank (ET3) Tec Champion Award;
The Distinguished Alumni Award, Alcorn State University, Dallas Alumni Chapter;
The Distinguished Alumni Award, Alcorn State University, Washington D.C.;
Texas Association of Black Personnel in Higher Education Presidential Award 1997 and 2007

References

External links
St. Philip's College 
Official Biography of Dr. Adena Williams Loston, NASA's Chief Education Officer
Official Biography of Dr. Adena Williams Loston, St. Philip's College President

Heads of universities and colleges in the United States
Living people
1953 births